RACS may refer to:
Royal Australasian College of Surgeons
Royal Arsenal Co-operative Society